A Yank in Libya is a 1942 American war thriller film directed by Albert Herman and starring H. B. Warner, Walter Woolf King, Parkyarkarkus and Joan Woodbury.

Plot 
American correspondent Mike Malone uncovers a Nazi plot for an uprising of the Arab tribes in Libya. Pursued by Sheik David and his men, Mike takes refuge in the suite of Nancy Brooks, who is in the British Intelligence. He asks her to hide a gun and escapes through a window. Reporting the affair to British Consul Herbert Forbes, the latter tries to discourage him from further investigation, as the British are aware of the plot and are planning on staging a coup. He goes with Mike to Nancy's apartment, and she denies having ever seen him before. Sheik Ibrahim, next in command of the Arab tribe to Sheik David, is plotting with Nazi agent Yussof Streyer to kill David who is friendly with the British. Mike and Nancy have gone to David's camp, escape from Ibrahim's henchmen, and get back to El Moktar before the Arabs attack the garrison.

Cast 
H. B. Warner as Herbert Forbes
Walter Woolf King as Mike Malone
Joan Woodbury as Nancy Brooks
Parkyarkarkus as Benny Sykes
Duncan Renaldo as Shiek David
George Lewis as Shiek Ibrahim
William Vaughn as Yussof Streyer
Howard Banks as Phillip Graham
Amarilla Morris as Haditha

References

Bibliography
Casaregola, Vincent. Theaters of War: America’s Perceptions of World War II. Springer, 2009.

External links 

1942 films
American black-and-white films
1942 romantic drama films
American war drama films
Producers Releasing Corporation films
World War II films made in wartime
American romantic drama films
Films directed by Albert Herman
Films set in Libya
1940s English-language films